Washington County Community College (WCCC) is a public community college in Calais in Washington County, Maine. The college is on a hillside overlooking the St. Croix River Valley at the edge of a  campus of mature woods and fields.

WCCC is part of the Maine Community College System. Founded in 1969, Washington County Community College (WCCC) offers associate degree programs, diplomas, and certificates. The Liberal Studies program offers students the opportunity to obtain their first two years of a baccalaureate credential at WCCC before transferring to another college or university. WCCC has a number of program articulation agreements with four-year institutions throughout the state to assist students to transfer upon meeting the necessary course requirements.

External links
Official website

 
Calais, Maine
Community colleges in Maine
Universities and colleges in Washington County, Maine